Anderson Pyramid is a distinctive pyramidal peak, the southernmost member of the Bigler Nunataks, in the Usarp Mountains of Antarctica. It was named by the Advisory Committee on Antarctic Names for Staff Sergeant Robert J. Anderson, U. S. Army, non-commissioned officer in charge of the enlisted detachment of the helicopter group supporting the United States Geological Survey survey Topo East-West, 1962–63, which included the survey of this feature.

References
 

Mountains of Oates Land